Windows is a Los Angeles-based country-psych band founded in 2018 by Matteo Arias former bass player of Golden Animals.

History
Windows was founded as a bedroom recording project in 2018 by Matteo Arias. He was soon joined Spencer Alarcon, and later by Australian bassist Sam Wotherspoon. Windows' sound consists of old California country, classic surf rock, and West Coast psychedelia. In February 2019 the band released their first single "The Ballad Of Whiskey Pete".  In 2020 the band planned to release their debut LP but in light of the COVID-19 outbreak decided to instead write and record two singles remotely while locked down in quarantine. The singles were self released on July 2. Post pandemic Arias began work on a new music with a new line up including some members of his former band Golden Animals. In February of 2023 the band released their first two studio singles "High Sierra Lows" & "Long-While".

Discography

References

Musical groups from Los Angeles
Psychedelic musical groups